Woodland Hills Junior / Senior High School is a large, suburban public high school providing grades 9-12 for the Woodland Hills School District located in Churchill, Pennsylvania, United States. It serves the communities of Braddock, Braddock Hills, Chalfant, Churchill, East Pittsburgh, Edgewood, Forest Hills, North Braddock, Rankin, Swissvale, Turtle Creek and Wilkins Township. Woodland Hills Junior / Senior High School was the result of a 1981 court-ordered desegregation merger. Before the merger, it was named Churchill High School.

In the 2018–2019 school year, enrollment was reported as 1,381 pupils in 9th through 12th grades.

Students may attend Forbes Road CTC for training in the trades. The Allegheny Intermediate Unit (IU3) provides the school with a wide variety of services like specialized education for disabled students and hearing, speech and visual disability services, as well as professional development for staff and faculty.

Sports

The school's athletic teams are part of the Pennsylvania Interscholastic Athletic Association (PIAA) and the Western Pennsylvania Interscholastic Athletic League (WPIAL).

Notable accomplishments
Girls' track - WPIAL Champion: 1987
Girls' basketball - WPIAL Champion: 1997, PIAA State Runner-Up: 1997
Bowling - WPIAL Champion: 2008
Rifle - PIAA State Champion: 2014, 2015, 2016, 2017. PIAA Runner-Up: 2012. WPIAL Champion:  1992, 1998, 2012, 2014, 2015, 2016
Football - PIAA State Runner-Up:  1996, 2001, 2002. WPIAL Champion:  1996, 1999, 2001, 2002, 2009.

The football program has produced nearly 100 Division I football recruits. In 2010, the school had six graduates in the NFL, the most of any high school in the United States: Jason Taylor, Steve Breaston, Lousaka Polite, Ryan Mundy, Shawntae Spencer and Rob Gronkowski. Other Wolverine alumni in the NFL include Miles Sanders, Terrence Johnson, Lafayette Pitts, Rontez Miles, Darrin Walls and Quinton Jefferson.

Alumni

 Steve Breaston, former football wide receiver
 John Clayton, sportswriter
 Chris Edmonds, former football end and fullback
 Mark Gilbert, baseball player and diplomat
 Tirrell Greene, former football offensive lineman
 Rob Gronkowski, football tight end
 Alex Guminski, sports agent and attorney
 Quinton Jefferson, football defensive end
 Terrence Johnson, football cornerback
 Summer Lee, lawyer and politician
 Wes Lyons, former football wide receiver
 Rontez Miles, football strong safety
 Ryan Mundy, former football safety
 Lafayette Pitts, football cornerback
 Lousaka Polite, former football fullback
 Tad Potter, businessman
 Ejuan Price, former football outside linebacker
 Antwon Rose Jr., fatally shot by East Pittsburgh police
 Miles Sanders (Boobie Miles), football running back
 Monte Simmons, football linebacker
 Shawntae Spencer, former football cornerback
 Jason Taylor, former football player NFL Hall of Famer
 Jim Tomsula, football coach
 Darrin Walls, football player

References

External links

 churchillareahighschool.com
 District website

Public high schools in Pennsylvania
Educational institutions established in 1987
Education in Pittsburgh area
Schools in Allegheny County, Pennsylvania
1987 establishments in Pennsylvania